Monique Kirsanoff (born Berthe Noëlla Bessette) was a film editor active in France from the 1930s through the 1980s. She was married to Estonia-born director Dimitri Kirsanoff.

Selected filmography 

 The Blood Rose (1970)
 All Mad About Him (1967)
 Tender Scoundrel (1966)
 Crime on a Summer Morning (1965)
 Backfire (1964)
 The Stowaway (1958)
 The Count of Monte Cristo (1954)
 She and Me (1952)
 Monsieur Leguignon, Signalman (1952)
 The Red Needle (1951)
 Les anciens de Saint-Loup (1950)
 Miquette (1950)
 Return to Life (1949)
 Fantômas (1947)
 Devil and the Angel (1946)
 Special Mission (1946)
 The Last Metro (1945)
 Blondine (1945)

References

External links

French women film editors
French film editors
Year of birth missing
Year of death missing